Murshidabad Medical College and Hospital is a government-run medical college located in Berhampore, Murshidabad district, West Bengal, India. This college was established in 2012, mainly it serves the people of district Murshidabad, Birbhum and the northern part of Nadia by providing preventive, diagnostic and curative services.

About College
Currently it has a capacity of 125 MBBS and 65 paramedical students per year. The college received its LOP (Letter of permission) on 30/06/2012 as informed by Dr Ranjan Bhattacharyya, Associate Prof & HOD, Dept of Psychiatry who is posted here since the very first day from which the foundation stone of Murshidabad Medical College & Hospital was laid down. Students to these seats are admitted through NEET. It is affiliated to West Bengal University of Health Sciences, recognised by Medical Council of India (presently National Medical Commission) and State Medical Faculty of West Bengal. From 2020 session, it got approval for 24 PG seats.

Campus
The college has two campuses, both in the city of Berhampore. A main campus of 32 acres where the academic building (g+7), administrative block, main hospital building (g+2), OPD building (g+5), Matri Ma (mother and child hub) (g+5), faculty quarters, hostels and other staff quarters are situated. A cancer block is also coming up shortly in this campus. The academic building houses the office of the Principal, central library, air conditioned lecture theatres and the preclinical departments along with their own separate libraries, demonstration rooms, museums and laboratories. There is a central research laboratory and also the Viral Research and Diagnostic Laboratory (VRDL). There is a 600-seater state of the art auditorium situated inside the academic building. It also houses the mortuary and post mortem room maintained by the dept of Forensic Medicine and Toxicology, and a dissection hall maintained by the dept of Anatomy.

The second campus is located at around 2.5 km from the main campus. Here the nursing school is situated. Matri Sadan hospital which has been converted into a 300 bedded Covid hospital is also situated in the same campus. 

There are separate hostels for undergraduate boys and girls, intern doctors, resident doctors and post graduate trainees. There are four (as of 2022) canteens to cater to the needs of the students, faculty members and also for the relatives of the patients. 

The Nabagram Block Primary Healthcare Centre is associated with the dept of Community Medicine of the college.

Campus life

Various festivals are celebrated by the students throughout the year.
 Avseende - Teachers' Day celebrations (Name given by Dr. Haimanti Bhattacharya)
 Au Revoir - Annual Convocation Ceremony
 Saraswati Puja 
 Bienvenue - Freshers' Welcome Party (Name given by Dr. Arnab Chakraborty)
 Chronaxie - The Annual Cultural Festival, in which some other colleges also participate (Name given by Dr. Arnab Chakraborty)
 Annual Sports meets consisting of Football, Cricket, Badminton, Volleyball, Arm-wrestling, Tug-of-war, Kho-kho, table tennis & other games
 White Coat ceremony

Departments

 Anaesthesiology
 Anatomy
 Biochemistry 
 Community Medicine 
 Dentistry
 Dermatology 
 ENT 
 Emergency
 Forensic Medicine and Toxicology 
 General Surgery
 Gynaecology and Obstetrics 
 Medicine
 Microbiology
 Ophthalmology 
 Orthopaedics
 Pathology 
 Physiology
 Paediatric Medicine 
 Pharmacology 
 Psychiatry
 Physical Medicine and Rehabilitation 
 Respiratory Medicine 
 Radiology 
 Radiotherapy 
 School of Nursing

Courses

 MBBS
 MD
 MS
 GNM Nursing
 Paramedical (DMLT, DRD, DOTT, ECG, DCCT, DOPT)

Former Principals

 Prof.(Dr.) Pradip Kumar Saha
 Prof.(Dr.) Ajay Kumar Ray
 Prof.(Dr.) Manju Banerjee
 Prof.(Dr.) Sarmila Mallick

See also

References

External links
 

Medical colleges in West Bengal
Universities and colleges in Murshidabad district
Educational institutions established in 2012
2012 establishments in West Bengal